Bolton River may refer to:

Bolton River (Manitoba), a river in the Hudson Bay drainage basin in Northern Region, Manitoba
Bolton River (Ontario), a river near the community of Iron Bridge in Huron Shores, Algoma District, Ontario